Yagodnoye is a rural locality (a selo) and the administrative center of Yagodnovskoye Rural Settlement, Olkhovsky District, Volgograd Oblast, Russia. The population was 735 as of 2010. There are 10 streets.

Geography 
Yagodnoye is located in steppe, on the Volga Upland, 22 km southeast of Olkhovka (the district's administrative centre) by road. Lipovka is the nearest rural locality.

References 

Rural localities in Olkhovsky District
Tsaritsynsky Uyezd